Márcio Marcelo Leite Júnior (born 14 January 1993), simply known as Márcio, is a Brazilian professional footballer who plays as a central defender for São Bento.

References

External links

1993 births
Living people
Footballers from São Paulo (state)
Brazilian footballers
Association football defenders
Campeonato Brasileiro Série A players
Campeonato Brasileiro Série C players
Sport Club Atibaia players
Associação Desportiva Confiança players
Coritiba Foot Ball Club players
Paraná Clube players
Clube de Regatas Brasil players
Boa Esporte Clube players
Clube Atlético Penapolense players
Esporte Clube São Bento players
People from Porto Felix